Chertezh is a rural locality (a village) in Kisnemskoye Rural Settlement, Vashkinsky District, Vologda Oblast, Russia. The population was 40 as of 2002.

Geography 
Chertezh is located 18 km northwest of Lipin Bor (the district's administrative centre) by road. Grikshino is the nearest rural locality.

References 

Rural localities in Vashkinsky District